"Do You Feel Like We Do" is a song by Peter Frampton originally appearing on his Frampton's Camel album that he released in 1973. The song became one of the highlights of his live performances in the following years, and it became one of the three hit singles released from his Frampton Comes Alive! album, released in 1976. The live version was recorded at the State University of New York Plattsburgh's Memorial Hall. This live version is featured in Guitar Hero 5 and as downloadable content for Rock Band 3. The studio version of the song is available as downloadable content for 
Rocksmith 2014.

Writing and recording
The song was written and composed in the early 1970s with members of Frampton's band, then called "Frampton's Camel." It was released on the 1973 Frampton's Camel album.  This version was shorter than the duration of the live version (approximately 14 minutes), with the studio recording totaling 6 minutes and 44 seconds, and it was not released as a single. The closing notes of the studio version features a guitar riff that has a strong resemblance to The Beatles's "Baby's in Black".

The title of the song is "Do You Feel Like We Do," although the lyrics read, "Do you feel like I do?" Only after Bob Mayo's electric piano solo in the Frampton Comes Alive! version does Frampton sing, "Do you feel like we do?", but sings "Do you feel like I do?" through the talk box in the midst of his extended guitar solo.

After the lack of success of his "Camel," Frampton performed under his own name and began touring the United States extensively for the next two years, supporting acts such as The J. Geils Band and ZZ Top, as well as performing his own shows at smaller venues. As a result, he developed a strong live following while his albums sold moderately and his singles failed to chart.

"Do You Feel Like We Do" became the closing number of his set and one of the highlights of his show. His concert version was considerably longer, with the version recorded on Frampton Comes Alive! alone exceeding 14 minutes, 4 of which are spent in the rock intro, 4 in the loud rock subito fortissimo outro, and 6 in the long, quiet bridge, featuring several instrumental solos utilizing Bob Mayo's electric piano and Frampton's guitar and talk box skills.  Most famously of these were the aforementioned talk box solos, which were performed using an effects pedal that redirects a guitar's sound through a tube coming from the performer's mouth, allowing the guitar to mimic human speech, similarly to a vocoder. Inspiration for the talk box came from Frampton listening to the call letters of Radio Luxembourg. Following the success of the talk box solos, Frampton subsequently marketed such talk boxes under his own "Framptone" brand.

As a result of the strength of Frampton's live show, A&M Records decided to release a live album taped when Frampton performed at Winterland in San Francisco. Frampton Comes Alive! was originally going to be a single album until Jerry Moss asked, "Where's the rest?" "Do You Feel Like We Do" was one of the tracks added to the album as a result of the decision to expand the album into a double album. The selection had been recorded live on November 22, 1975 on the college campus of SUNY Plattsburgh in Plattsburgh, New York.

Release as a single
"Do You Feel Like We Do" was released as the third single from Frampton Comes Alive! in September 1976. On September 8, U.S. President Gerald Ford invited him to stay at the White House as a result of the success of Frampton Comes Alive! It was edited down extensively for the 45 RPM single and promo single for pop radio stations, but this version was still seven minutes long. Many radio stations were known to edit the song down even further, to make it fit into the then-tightly-programmed AM radio formats. It reached number 10 on the US pop charts and number 39 in the UK, making it one of the longest songs to reach the US top 10.

Record World said that it "is the third single from the [[Frampton Comes Alive!] lp and is shaping up as [Frampton's] biggest yet!"

Other performances
Frampton continues to play this song live to close his concerts, and he played the song in his solo spot while playing with Ringo Starr & His All-Starr Band in 1997 and 1998 with a piano solo of Gary Brooker bass solo of Jack Bruce and the version length was about 19 minutes. The Simpsons episode "Homerpalooza" featured the song with the London Symphony Orchestra supporting Frampton.

Frampton appeared in a 2009 Geico commercial (part of their series coupling an actual Geico customer with a celebrity), playing talk box guitar commentary with a woman describing her auto accident and Geico's help in getting a settlement. Frampton closed the commercial with an improv riff from the song.

Frampton plays the opening notes of the song for a 2012 TV commercial for the 2012 Buick Verano.

Chart history

Weekly charts

Year-end charts

Notable covers
A cover by Warren Haynes is included on the iTunes deluxe edition of Frampton Comes Alive!References

 "Peter Frampton" article in Contemporary Musicians, Volume 3. Gale Research, 1990. Reproduced in Biography Resource Center. Farmington Hills, Mich.: Thomson Gale. 2005.
 Moss, Jerry. cited in Classic Bands article on Peter Frampton
Crowe, Cameron (1976). "Do You Feel Like We Do"  In Frampton Comes Alive! [CD liner notes]. Santa Monica: A&M Records.
 Peter Frampton in "Homerpalooza" (episode of The Simpsons, originally aired May 19, 1996)
 The live version of the song was used in 2009's Guitar Hero 5''.

External links
 [ Allmusic.com article on "Do You Feel Like We Do"]
 Songfacts article on "Do You Feel Like We Do"
 Classic Bands article on Peter Frampton
 Epinions article on Peter Frampton
 Simpsons episode guide on "Homerpalooza"

Peter Frampton songs
1976 singles
1973 songs
Songs written by Peter Frampton
Song recordings produced by Peter Frampton
Live singles
A&M Records singles